Camel Corps may refer to:

Military units
Camel cavalry units in the Spanish, French, Italian and British colonial possessions in North Africa and the Middle East, for instance:
Méhariste, a camel mounted African unit in the French army
 Free French Camel Corps, a camel cavalry unit of the Free French forces under General Charles de Gaulle during World War II in Eastern Africa
Tropas Nómadas, an auxiliary regiment to the colonial army in Spanish Sahara (1930s–1975)

Military formations
United States Camel Corps, a mid-nineteenth century experiment by the United States Army in using camels as pack animals in the Southwest United States
Scinde Camel Corps, an infantry regiment of the British Indian Army (1843–1853)
Egyptian Camel Corps, fighting in the Battle of Kirbekan and Ginnis (both 1885)
Camel Corps (Gordon Relief Expedition), a camel corps in the Desert Column of the Gordon Relief Expedition (1884–85) under the command of Herbert Stewart, earning their colours in the Battle of Abu Klea
Imperial Camel Corps, an Allied unit that fought in the Sinai and Palestine Campaign during World War I (1916–1919)
Somaliland Camel Corps, a unit of the British Army based in British Somaliland (1914–1944)
Sudan Camel Corps ('the Hajana'), a battalion in the Sudan Defence Force (1925–1950s)
Bikaner Camel Corps, a unit of Imperial Service Troops from India (1889–present)

Other
Camel Corps, nickname for British Foreign Office officials in the Middle East, see Adel Darwish